Paul Karl Ludwig Drude (12 July 1863 – 5 July 1906) was a German physicist specializing in optics.  He wrote a fundamental textbook integrating optics with Maxwell's theories of electromagnetism.

Education
Born into an ethnic German family, Drude began his studies in mathematics at the University of Göttingen, but later changed his major to physics. His dissertation covering the reflection and diffraction of light in crystals was completed in 1887, under Woldemar Voigt.

Career
In 1894 Drude became an extraordinarius professor at the University of Leipzig; in the same year he married Emilie Regelsberger, daughter of a Göttingen lawyer. They had four children.  In 1900, he became the editor for the scientific journal Annalen der Physik, the most respected physics journal at that time.  From 1901 to 1905, he was ordinarius professor of physics at Giessen University.  In 1905 he became the director of the physics institute of the University of Berlin.  In 1906, at the height of his career, he became a member of the Prussian Academy of Sciences.  A few days after his inauguration lecture, for inexplicable reasons, he committed suicide.  Drude was survived by his wife and four children.

Work
Drude graduated the year Heinrich Hertz began publishing his findings from his experiments on the electromagnetic theories of James Clerk Maxwell.  Thus Drude began his professional career at the time Maxwell's theories were being introduced into Germany. His first experiments were the determination of the optical constants of various solids, measured to unprecedented levels of accuracy. He then worked to derive relationships between the optical and electrical constants and the physical structure of substances. In 1894 he was responsible for introducing the symbol "c" for the speed of light in a perfect vacuum.

Toward the end of his tenure at Leipzig, Drude was invited to write a textbook on optics, which he accepted.  The book, Lehrbuch der Optik, published in 1900, brought together the formerly distinct subjects of electricity and optics, which was cited by Drude as an “epoch-making advance in natural science.”

In 1900 he developed a powerful model to explain the thermal, electrical, and optical properties of matter. The Drude model would be further advanced in 1933 by Arnold Sommerfeld and Hans Bethe.

Honors
 The crater Drude on the Moon is named after him.
 The Paul-Drude-Institut für Festkörperelektronik, in Berlin, was named in his honor.

Bibliography
 Lehrbuch der Optik, Leipzig, 1906.

Notes

Sources
 Jungnickel, Christa and Russell McCormmach. Intellectual Mastery of Nature: Theoretical Physics from Ohm to Einstein, Volume 1: The Torch of Mathematics, 1800 to 1870. University of Chicago Press, paper cover, 1990a.  .
 Jungnickel, Christa and Russell McCormmach. Intellectual Mastery of Nature: Theoretical Physics from Ohm to Einstein, Volume 2: The Now Mighty Theoretical Physics, 1870 to 1925. University of Chicago Press, Paper cover, 1990b.  .

External links
 Brief biography

1863 births
1906 suicides
19th-century German physicists
Members of the Prussian Academy of Sciences
Scientists from Braunschweig
People from the Duchy of Brunswick
University of Göttingen alumni
Academic staff of Leipzig University
Academic staff of the University of Giessen
Academic staff of the Humboldt University of Berlin
Suicides in Germany
1906 deaths